Paul M. Lawson (January 29, 1914 – February 20, 1988) was a Democratic member of the Pennsylvania House of Representatives. He graduated from Penn State University.

References

Democratic Party members of the Pennsylvania House of Representatives
1914 births
1988 deaths
20th-century American politicians